The W. R. Stafford Worker's House, also known as the Blue Town House, is a private house located at 8022 Cedar Street in Port Hope, Michigan.  It was listed on the National Register of Historic Places in 1987.

History
This house was likely built in the 1870s, or possibly the 1860s, as one of a set of six houses. The houses were built for workers employed by W.R. Stafford in his salt block or agricultural operations. This house likely was for a married worker and his family.

Description
The Blue Town House is a narrow-fronted, two-story, vernacular end-gable structure with a single story ell projecting to the rear. The structure is sheathed with clapboard, and has simple raking Greek Revival cornices without returns ad entrance trim. The windows are double-hung, two-over-two units. In the interior, the first floor contains a living room, a dining room, a kitchen, and a staircase to the second floor. The second floor space is divided into front and rear rooms.

References

National Register of Historic Places in Huron County, Michigan
Buildings and structures completed in 1875